The 2010 United States Senate election in Colorado took place on November 2, 2010, alongside other elections to the United States Senate in other states as well as elections to the United States House of Representatives and various state and local elections. In December 2008, President-elect Barack Obama nominated incumbent U.S. Senator Ken Salazar as Secretary of the Interior. After Salazar resigned from his seat, Democratic governor Bill Ritter appointed Denver Public Schools Superintendent Michael Bennet to fill the seat.

Bennet won a full term, defeating former state House speaker Andrew Romanoff in the Democratic primary, and Republican nominee Ken Buck in the general election. With a margin of 1.7%, this election was the second closest race of the 2010 Senate election cycle after the concurrent one in Illinois.

Democratic primary

Candidates

Declared
 Michael Bennet, incumbent U.S. Senator
 Andrew Romanoff, former speaker of the Colorado House of Representatives

Endorsements 
Bennet
 President Barack Obama
 U.S. Senator Russ Feingold
 Congresswoman Diana DeGette
 Congressman Ed Perlmutter
 Congresswoman Betsy Markey
 U.S. Senator Mark Udall
 Congressman Jared Polis
 Congressman John Salazar
 Former U.S. Senator Gary Hart
 Governor Bill Ritter

Romanoff
 Former president Bill Clinton

Polling

Results

Republican primary

Candidates

Declared
 Ken Buck, Weld County District Attorney
 Jane Norton, former Lieutenant Governor of Colorado

Declined
 Bob Beauprez, former U.S. Representative for Colorado's 7th congressional district
 Troy Eid, U.S. Attorney for United States District Court for the District of Colorado
 Ryan Frazier, Aurora city councilman

Withdrew
 Tom Wiens, former state senator

Other
Three other candidates were defeated at the Republican state convention and were not on the primary ballot:
 Cleve Tidwell, businessman
 Robert Greenheck
 Steve Barton

Endorsements

Polling

Results

Libertarian primary

Candidates 
 John Finger
 Mac Stringer

Results

General election

Candidates

Major 
 Michael Bennet (D), incumbent U.S. Senator
 Ken Buck (R), Weld County DA

Minor 
 Bob Kinsey (G) (campaign site, archived November 4, 2010, PVS)
 Charley Miller (I) (campaign site, PVS)
 J. Moromisato (I) (campaign site, PVS)
 Jason Napolitano (I) (PVS)
 Mac Stringer (L) (campaign site, PVS)
 Bruce E. Lohmiller (G) (Write-in) (Congress.org)
 Michele M. Newman (I) (Write-in)
 Robert Rank (R) (Write-in) campaign site, YouTube campaign video
Source: Official Candidate List

Campaign 
This was one of the most expensive elections in the nation, as more than $30 million was spent by outside organizations. Conservative third party groups hammered Bennet for voting 92% of the time with the Democratic leadership, including voting for healthcare reform and the stimulus package. Liberal third party groups called Buck extremist. Bennet focused on attacking Buck's views on abortion, which he believed should be banned including those of cases of rape and incest. He was also attacked for wanting to eliminate the 17th Amendment and refusing to prosecute an alleged rapist as Weld County district attorney. Planned Parenthood mounted a mail campaign, targeting women voters with the warning that "Colorado women can't trust Ken Buck." Bennet won the women vote by 17 points according to exit polls. After the election, Buck conceded to the Denver Post that the main reason why he lost is because of social issues.

Debates 
 September 12: Sponsored by Club 20 in Grand Junction

Predictions

Polling

Fundraising 

These totals reflect the campaign accounts of the candidates themselves, and do not include independent expenditures by other groups.

Results

References

External links 
 Colorado Secretary of State - Elections Center
 U.S. Congress candidates for Colorado at Project Vote Smart
 Colorado U.S. Senate 2010 from OurCampaigns.com
 Campaign contributions from Open Secrets
 2010 Colorado Senate General Election: All Head-to-Head Matchups graph of multiple polls from Pollster.com
 Election 2010: Colorado Senate from Rasmussen Reports
 2010 Colorado Senate Race from Real Clear Politics
 2010 Colorado Senate Race from CQ Politics
 Race profile from The New York Times
 Collected news and commentary at Election 2010 at The Denver Post
Debate
 Colorado Senate Republican Primary Debate on C-SPAN, July 23, 2010
 Colorado Senate Debate on C-SPAN, September 11, 2010
Official campaign websites (Archived)
 Steven Barton for U.S. Senate
 Michael Bennet for U.S. Senate incumbent
 Ken Buck for U.S. Senate
 Gary Kennedy for U.S. Senate
 Bob Kinsey for U.S. Senate
 Vincent Martinez for U.S. Senate
 Jane Norton for U.S. Senate
 Andrew Romanoff for U.S. Senate
 Cleve Tidwell for U.S. Senate
 Tom Wiens for U.S. Senate
 Michele M. Newman for U.S. Senate

2010 Colorado elections
Colorado
2010
Michael Bennet